The 2014–15 Dayton Flyers men's basketball team represented the University of Dayton during the 2014–15 NCAA Division I men's basketball season. The Flyers, led by fourth year head coach Archie Miller, played their home games at the University of Dayton Arena and were members of the Atlantic 10 Conference. They finished the season 27–9, 13–5 in A-10 play to finish in a tie for second place. They advanced to the championship game of the A-10 tournament where they lost to VCU. They received an at-large bid to the NCAA tournament where they defeated Boise State in the First Four and Providence in the second round before losing in the third round to Oklahoma.

When the Flyers were selected to play at home in the First Four, they became the first team since 1987 to play an NCAA Tournament game in their home arena. The NCAA made a rule in 1989 that no team could play a tournament game in their home arena. However, with UD Arena always hosting the First Four, Dayton is the only exception to the rule.

Previous season
The 2013–14 Dayton Flyers finished the season with an overall record of 26–11, with a record of 10–6 in the Atlantic 10 regular season for a tie for a fifth-place finish. In the 2014 Atlantic 10 tournament, the Flyers were defeated by Saint Joseph's, 70–67 in the quarterfinals. They received an at-large bid to the 2014 NCAA Division I men's basketball tournament which they upset Ohio State, Syracuse and Stanford in second and third rounds and the sweet sixteen before falling to Florida in the elite eight to end their Cinderella run.

Offseason

Departures

Incoming transfers

Incoming recruits

Season synopsis
The Flyers entered the season with three players capable of playing as centers, but by the start of 2015, none of the three were available to the team. First, the NCAA declared incoming freshman Steve McElvene a "partial qualifier", rendering him ineligible for the entire 2014–15 season.  Then, in December 2014, starting center Devon Scott and intended backup Jalen Robinson were dismissed from the team after allegedly being caught committing theft in a campus dormitory. Two other players were sidelined by injuries. Junior college transfer Detwon Rogers was lost for the season to a knee injury, and graduate transfer Ryan Bass quit basketball on medical advice due to post-concussion symptoms.

These departures and injuries left Dayton with arguably the most limited roster, in both depth and physical size, in Division I. The Flyers played the bulk of their season with only six players who started the season on scholarships. In January 2015, Bobby Wehrli, who had begun the season as a walk-on, was given a scholarship, but only for the spring of 2015. No one left on the active roster, whether on scholarship or not, was taller than 6'6" (1.98 m). CBS Sports journalist Gary Parrish had this to say about the Flyers' roster limitations (emphasis in original):"To put this into perspective, consider that Kentucky has seven scholarship players taller than 6-8, and that UK's starting backcourt (Andrew Harrison and Aaron Harrison) is just as tall as Dayton's starting frontcourt (Dyshawn Pierre and Kendall Pollard)."

Despite these limitations, the Flyers remained in contention for the A10 title for most of the season, ultimately finishing second in the regular-season standings, and advanced to the A10 tournament final, losing there to VCU.

Roster

Schedule

|-
!colspan=9 style="background:#C40023; color:white;"| Exhibition

|-
!colspan=9 style="background:#C40023; color:white;"| Non-conference regular season

|-
!colspan=9 style="background:#C40023; color:white;"| Atlantic 10 regular season

|-
!colspan=9 style="background:#C40023; color:white;"| Atlantic 10 tournament

|-
!colspan=9 style="background:#C40023; color:white;"| NCAA tournament

Rankings

See also
2014–15 Dayton Flyers women's basketball team

References

Dayton Flyers Men's
Dayton Flyers men's basketball seasons
Dayton
2014 in sports in Ohio
2015 in sports in Ohio